John P. "Monk" Cline  (March 3, 1858 – September 23, 1916) was a professional baseball player who primarily played outfield in the American Association for the Baltimore Orioles, Louisville Colonels and Kansas City Cowboys.

External links

1858 births
1916 deaths
Baltimore Orioles (AA) players
Louisville Eclipse players
Louisville Colonels players
Kansas City Cowboys players
Harrisburg (minor league baseball) players
Columbus Stars (baseball) players
Atlanta Atlantas players
Rochester Maroons players
Memphis Browns players
Memphis Grays players
Sioux City Corn Huskers players
Lincoln Rustlers players
Des Moines Prohibitionists players
St. Paul Apostles players
Memphis Giants players
Spokane Bunchgrassers players
Major League Baseball outfielders
Baseball players from Kentucky
Burials at Cave Hill Cemetery
19th-century baseball players